State Route 100 (SR 100) is a  state highway that travels south-to-north through portions of Meriwether, Troup, Heard, Carroll, Haralson, Polk, Floyd, and Chattooga counties in the northwestern part of the U.S. state of Georgia. The route begins at US 27 Alt./SR 18/SR 41/SR 109 in Greenville and ends at US 27/SR 1/SR 114 in Summerville.

Route description

SR 100 begins at an intersection with US 27 Alt./SR 18/SR 41/SR 109 in Greenville in Meriwether County. Moving north, SR 100 travels concurrent with SR 54 just east of the interchange with Interstate 85 (I-85) east of Hogansville. Once in Hogansville, SR 100 turns north concurrent with US 29/SR 14 for a short distance before continuing northwest alone. Southeast of Franklin, SR 100 joins US 27/SR 1. Just west of Franklin, SR 100, along with SR 34, splits from US 27 and continues west. SR 100 continues north and travels concurrent with SR 5 for a short distance east of the Georgia–Alabama state line before continuing north. As SR 100 moves toward Tallapoosa, it crosses I-20, where it is the first eastbound exit in the state for that highway. Crossing US 78 in Tallapoosa, SR 100 travels concurrent with US 27 south of Cedartown. South of Cedartown, SR 100 turns west following US 278 for a brief distance before resuming a northwestern path. In Cave Spring, SR 100 turns west for a brief distance concurrent with US 411 before turning north once again. SR 100 turns west concurrent with SR 20 for a short distance before resuming its northern course toward Summerville. SR 100 ends at the intersection of US 27/SR 114 in Summerville in Chattooga County.

Major intersections

Tallapoosa spur route

State Route 100 Spur (SR 100 Spur) is a  spur route that exists entirely within the southwestern part of Haralson County. Its routing is entirely within the city limits of Tallapoosa.

It begins in the southern portion of Tallapoosa, at an intersection with the SR 100 mainline (Alewine Avenue). The highway travels to the east-northeast and quickly curves to the northwest. Just past Golf Course Road, the spur curves to the north-northeast and meets its northern terminus, an intersection with US 78/SR 8 (East Atlanta Street) in the eastern part of town.

See also

References

External links

 

100
Transportation in Meriwether County, Georgia
Transportation in Troup County, Georgia
Transportation in Heard County, Georgia
Transportation in Carroll County, Georgia
Transportation in Haralson County, Georgia
Transportation in Polk County, Georgia
Transportation in Floyd County, Georgia
Transportation in Chattooga County, Georgia